Simin (also Romanized as Sīmīn and Sīmīn; also known as Sīmīn and Sīmīn-e Anjalas) is a village in Abaru Rural District, in the Central District of Hamadan County, Hamadan Province, Iran. At the 2006 census, its population was 323, in 72 families.

References 

Populated places in Hamadan County